Trewartha and Andrewartha are Cornish family names (and placename, Dexter). There are places called Trewartha in the parishes of Merther, St Agnes, St Neot and Veryan.

According to the Handbook of Cornish Names by G. Pawley White, "Trewartha" is a Cornish name meaning "Upper Farm" or "Upper Homestead".

Cornish Names by Dr T. F. G. Dexter : Royal Institution of Cornwall : publ. 1926 Longmans Green: reprinted 1968 Bradford Barton : says on p. 15 -

Nouns: "tre" a "town", feminine, (maybe a hamlet or house, also Brythonic Celt Welsh "tref", about 4-500AD). Adjectives: "Wartha" : "upper" (maybe higher or greater or on a hill) cf. "Wollas" : "lower" ( maybe smaller or lesser or in a valley, of the two).

"Trewartha" page 25. "Andrewartha" page 60.

Definite Article: "An", (Brythonic Celt Cornish language)p18, is used as : of the, in the, on the, at the, in place names. [JEA 8.2009]

Tre = Farm, Homestead   (x)  - -   Wartha = Above, Upper(x)

As An is Cornish for The, and Dre is mutated from the Cornish "Tre" Andrewartha means "The Upper Farm" or "The Upper Homestead" and it is generally accepted that both names have the same meaning.

See also
Andrewartha
Billy Bray (William Trewartha Bray)
Glenn Thomas Trewartha

Surnames of British Isles origin
Cornish-language surnames